Chauffeur Antoinette is a 1932 German comedy film directed by Herbert Selpin and starring Charlotte Ander, Hans Adalbert Schlettow and Walter Steinbeck. It was shot at the Johannisthal Studios in Berlin. The film's sets were designed by the art director Erich Czerwonski. A British remake The Love Contract was produced the same year and a French version Antoinette was also released.

Synopsis
Antoinette, a wealthy young widow, runs into financial difficulties after investing in the stock markets and is forced to sell her villa and car. By chance one day she encounters William P. Harrison, the speculator responsible for her losses who is now the owner of her house. After she helps fix his car, he offers her a bet. If she can work as his chauffeur for three months without any problems he will restore her lost fortune to her. In spite of the fact he tries to make things as difficult as possible for her, the two gradually fall in love.

Cast
 Charlotte Ander as Antoinette Peterson
 Hans Adalbert Schlettow as William P. Harrison
 Walter Steinbeck as Dr. Lothar Sauvage
 Georgia Lind as Stephanie, seine Frau
 Ludwig Stössel as Baron Kiesel
 Julius Falkenstein as Hadrian
 Elza Temary	
 Harry Halm	
 Ernst Behmer		
 Bertold Reissig
 Charles Willy Kayser	
 Fritz Karchow

References

Bibliography
 Klaus, Ulrich J. Deutsche Tonfilme: Jahrgang 1932. Klaus-Archiv, 1988.
 Wright, Adrian. Cheer Up!: British Musical Films 1929-1945. The Boydell Press, 2020.

External links 
 

1932 films
Films of the Weimar Republic
German comedy films
1932 comedy films
1930s German-language films
German black-and-white films
1930s German films
Films directed by Herbert Selpin
Films shot at Johannisthal Studios

de:Chauffeur Antoinette